Greeneville Municipal Airport  is a public airport located two miles (3 km) north of the central business district of Greeneville, a town in Greene County, Tennessee, United States. It is owned by the Town of Greeneville.

Facilities and aircraft 
For the 12-month period ending March 30, 1998, the airport had 43,500 aircraft operations, an average of 119 per day: 69% general aviation, 30% air taxi and 1% military.

References

External links 
Greeneville Municipal Airport page at Tennessee DOT Airport Directory

Airports in Tennessee
Buildings and structures in Greene County, Tennessee
Transportation in Greene County, Tennessee